Greenbay is a village in Antigua in Saint John Parish, known especially as the birthplace of the calypsonian King Obstinate.

Demographics 
Greenbay has three enumeration districts.

 11100 Green Bay School
 11200 Green Bay Canal
 10800 Green Bay Ext

Census Data

References

Populated places in Antigua and Barbuda
Saint John Parish, Antigua and Barbuda